"The Garden of Forking Paths" (original Spanish title: "El jardín de senderos que se bifurcan") is a 1941 short story by Argentine writer and poet Jorge Luis Borges. It is the title story in the collection El jardín de senderos que se bifurcan (1941), which was republished in its entirety in Ficciones (Fictions) in 1944. It was the first of Borges's works to be translated into English by Anthony Boucher when it appeared in Ellery Queen's Mystery Magazine in August 1948.

The story's theme has been said to foreshadow the many worlds interpretation of quantum mechanics. It may have been inspired by work of the philosopher and science fiction author Olaf Stapledon.

Borges's vision of "forking paths" has been cited as inspiration by numerous new media scholars, in particular within the field of hypertext fiction. Other stories by Borges that express the idea of infinite texts include "The Library of Babel" and "The Book of Sand".

Plot summary

The story takes the form of a signed statement by a Chinese professor of English named Doctor Yu Tsun, who is living in the United Kingdom during World War I. Tsun is a spy for Abteilung IIIb, the military intelligence service of Imperial Germany.

As the story begins, Doctor Tsun has realized that an MI5 agent called Captain Richard Madden is pursuing him, has entered the apartment of his handler, Viktor Runeberg, and has either captured or killed him. Doctor Tsun is certain that his own arrest is next. He has just discovered the location of a new British artillery park and wishes to convey that knowledge to Berlin before he is captured. He at last hits upon a plan to achieve this.

Doctor Tsun explains that his spying has never been for the sake of the Kaiser's Germany, which he considers "a barbarous country." Rather, he says, he knows that Germany's intelligence chief, Lieutenant-Colonel Walter Nicolai, believes the Chinese people to be racially inferior. Doctor Tsun is, therefore, determined to be more intelligent than any White spy and to obtain the information Nicolai needs to save the lives of German soldiers. Doctor Tsun suspects that Captain Madden, an Irish Catholic in the employ of the British Empire, is similarly motivated.

Taking his few possessions, Doctor Tsun boards a train to the village of Ashgrove. Narrowly avoiding the pursuing Captain Madden at the railway station, he goes to the house of Doctor Stephen Albert, an eminent Sinologist. As he walks up the road to Doctor Albert's house, Doctor Tsun reflects on his great ancestor, Ts'ui Pên, a learned and famous civil servant who renounced his post as governor of Yunnan Province to undertake two tasks: write a vast and intricate novel and construct an equally-vast and intricate labyrinth "in which all men would lose their way." Ts'ui Pên was murdered before he could complete his novel, however, and wrote a "contradictory jumble of irresolute drafts" that made no sense to subsequent readers, and the labyrinth was never found.

Doctor Tsun arrives at the house of Doctor Albert, who is deeply excited to meet a descendant of Ts'ui Pên. Doctor Albert reveals that he has himself been engaged in a longtime study and an English translation of Ts'ui Pên's novel. Albert explains excitedly that at one stroke he has solved both mysteries: the chaotic and jumbled nature of Ts'ui Pên's unfinished book and the mystery of his lost labyrinth. Doctor Albert's solution is that they are the same, and the novel is the labyrinth.

Basing his work on the strange legend that Ts'ui Pên had intended to construct an infinite labyrinth and on a cryptic letter from Ts'ui Pên himself stating, "I leave to several futures (not to all) my garden of forking paths," Doctor Albert realized that the "garden of forking paths" was the novel and that the forking takes place in time, rather than space. In most fictions, a character chooses one alternative at each decision point and eliminates all of the others. In Ts'ui Pên's novel, however, all possible outcomes of an event occur simultaneously, all of which themselves lead to further proliferations of possibilities. Albert further explains that the constantly-diverging paths sometimes converge again but as the result of a different chain of causes. For example, Doctor Albert says that in one possible timeline, Doctor Tsun has come to his house as an enemy but in another, he comes as a friend.

Though trembling with gratitude at Doctor Albert's revelation and at his ancestor's genius, Doctor Tsun glances up the path to see Captain Madden rushing towards the door. Knowing that time is short, Doctor Tsun asks to see Ts'ui Pên's letter again. As Doctor Albert turns to retrieve it, Doctor Tsun draws a revolver and murders him in cold blood.

Completing his manuscript as he awaits death by hanging, Doctor Tsun explains that he has been arrested, convicted of first-degree murder, and sentenced to death. However, he has "most abhorrently triumphed" by revealing to Nicolai the location of the artillery park. Indeed, the park was bombed by the Imperial German Air Service during Tsun's trial. The location of the artillery park was in Albert, near the battlefield of the Somme. Doctor Tsun had known that the only way to convey the information to Berlin was to murder a person with the same name so that news of the murder would appear in British newspapers, which connected with the name of his victim.

In modern culture
In 1987, Stuart Moulthrop created a hypertextual version of "The Garden of Forking Paths" titled Victory Garden.  This title was given to relate the Gulf War setting of his novel and Borges' 1941 Garden. Moulthrop's work has been published as a hypertext by Eastgate and has been discussed in academic literature.
In homage to the story, the TV series FlashForward made an episode entitled "The Garden of Forking Paths". In the episode, the character Dyson Frost refers to a map of the possible futures as his "Garden of Forking Paths".
Parallels have been drawn between the concepts in the story and the many-worlds interpretation in physics by Bryce DeWitt in his preface to "The Many World Interpretation of Quantum Mechanics".
Statistician Andrew Gelman references "The Garden of Forking Paths" to describe how scientists can make false discoveries when they do not pre-specify a data analysis plan and instead choose "one analysis for the particular data they saw."  The "Garden of Forking Paths" refers to the near-infinite number of choices facing researchers in cleaning and analyzing data, and emphasizes the need for pre-analysis planning and independent replication, an especially relevant consideration in social psychology's recent replication crisis.
In 2016, episode 6 of the Netflix show The OA aired under the title "Chapter 6: Forking Paths". The main antagonist, Hap, has a conversation in a morgue with Leon who's conducting experiments to prove the existence of afterlife. Hap shares his hypothesis, opposed to Leon's, about multiple dimensions citing “a garden of forking paths” used by his subjects.
The story inspired a series of installations (2010–2017) by Singapore-based art collective Vertical Submarine.
Mark Z. Danielewski's novel, House of Leaves also had a great deal of influence from many of Borges' short stories, and the character Zampanò is somewhat of a Borges figure himself (his blindness, his obsession with infinity, his masterful writing that seems to loop back on itself but never in the same way...). "The Garden of Forking Paths" is specifically mentioned in footnote #167 of the novel. The story as a whole has close ties to his other short stories, namely The Book of Sand (El libro de arena) and The Library of Babel (La biblioteca de Babel).

See also
 Alternate history
 Choose Your Own Adventure
 Gilles Deleuze's use of this story to illustrate the Leibnizian concept of several impossible worlds simultaneously existing and the problem of future contingents.
Coherence, a 2013 film about people who must deal with reality-bending events following a comet sighting.
 Many-minds interpretation
 Many-worlds interpretation
 Multiverse

References

External links
 Stuart Moulthrop, "Concerning 'forking paths'"
 Silvio Gaggi, "Hyperrealities and Hypertexts"
 Lev Manovich, "New Media from Borges to HTML"
 Nick Montfort introduction to "The Garden of Forking Paths" in "The New Media Reader."

Short stories by Jorge Luis Borges
Postmodern literature
1941 short stories
Metafictional works
Short stories about parallel universes
World War I short stories
World War I espionage
Argentine speculative fiction works